Alan White (born 1951) is an American philosopher and Mark Hopkins Professor of Philosophy at Williams College. He was a president of the Metaphysical Society of America (2014).

Education and career
Alan White received his B.A. from Tulane University in 1972, followed by a M.A. and Ph.D. from Pennsylvania State University in 1976 and 1980 respectively under the direction of Stanley H. Rosen and Thomas Seebohm. He then took up visiting professor positions at Davidson College and East Tennessee State University before joining the faculty of The New School for Social Research in 1982 as Assistant Professor of Philosophy. In 1986, White moved to Williams College, holding the position of Assistant Professor of Philosophy. White was promoted to associate professor in 1990, full professor in 1993, and was granted an endowed professorship in 2000, becoming the Mark Hopkins Professor of Philosophy. In 2014, White served a one-year term as president of the Metaphysical Society of America.

Books
Absolute Knowledge: Hegel and the Problem of Metaphysics. Series in Continental Thought, Vol. 4. Ohio University Press, 1983.
Schelling: An Introduction to the System of Freedom. Yale University Press, 1983.
Within Nietzsche’s Labyrinth. Routledge, 1990.
G. W. F. Hegel. The Philosophy of Right. Translator and Editor. Focus Publishing, 2002.
Structure and Being. A Theoretical Framework for a Systematic Philosophy. Lorenz B. Puntel (Munich). Translated by and in collaboration with Alan White. Penn State University Press, 2008.
Being and God. A Systematic Approach in Confrontation with Heidegger, Levinas, and Marion. Lorenz B. Puntel (Munich). Translated by and in collaboration with Alan White. Northwestern UP, 2011.
Nothing Matters. A Philosophical Romance. A novel self-published in Kindle format, 2011.
Revenge. A novel self-published in Kindle format, 2011.
Toward a Philosophical Theory of Everything. Contributions to the Structural-Systematic Philosophy. Bloomsbury (formerly Continuum), 2014.
Rumo a Uma Teoria Filosófica de Tudo. Edições Loyola (Buenos Aires). (Portuguese version of 9.) Forthcoming.
In Richtung einer Philosophischen Theorie von Allem. (German version of 9.) In progress.

References

20th-century American philosophers
Continental philosophers
Philosophy academics
1951 births
Living people
Presidents of the Metaphysical Society of America
Williams College faculty
Pennsylvania State University alumni
Tulane University alumni